Goldrunner is a vertically scrolling shooter published  developed by Steve Bak and Pete Lyon for the Atari ST and published by Microdeal in 1987. Rob Hubbard composed the music. An Amiga version followed, as well as a sequel, 1988's Goldrunner II.

Gameplay
Goldrunner is a freely vertically scrolling shooter game where it is possible to fly back and forth as in Defender. The player steers a golden spaceship equipped with two laser cannons, flying over huge ring worlds whose structures must be destroyed. The ship has a speed booster to accelerate.

Legacy 
The immediate follow-on, Goldrunner II, offered a similar aesthetic to the original title. A third entry in the series was planned, entitled Goldrunner 3D. This was to mark a departure from the traditional 2D scrolling shooter format with a radical new look and gameplay. Trailed as early as 1989, the project suffered significant delays however, finally seeing release under Ocean as Epic in 1992.

References

1987 video games
Amiga games
Atari ST games
Video games scored by David Whittaker
Video games scored by Rob Hubbard
Video games developed in the United Kingdom
Vertically scrolling shooters